Fallen Gods is an original novella written by Jonathan Blum and Kate Orman and based on the long-running British science fiction television series Doctor Who.  It features the Eighth Doctor. It was released both as a standard edition hardback and a deluxe edition featuring a frontispiece by Daryl Joyce. Both editions have a foreword by Storm Constantine. It received the Aurealis Award for best Australian science fiction novel of 2004.

Plot
In the ancient Minoan empire a young girl develops timestream based abilities. Fortunately she has an expert to teach and train her, the time-traveling Doctor. She's going to need all the help she can get, as strange and malicious powers target her.

External links
The Cloister Library - Fallen Gods 
The Whoniverse - Discontinuity Guide entry for Fallen Gods 

2003 British novels
2003 science fiction novels
Doctor Who novellas
British science fiction novels
Novels by Jonathan Blum
Novels by Kate Orman
Telos Publishing books
Aurealis Award-winning works